Li Jingguang also known as Li Ching-kuang, (1947–16 June 2000) was a male former international table tennis player from China.

Table tennis career
He won two medals at the World Table Tennis Championships; a gold medal in the Swaythling Cup (men's team event) at the 1971   and a silver medal two years later in the Swaythling Cup.

See also
 List of table tennis players
 List of World Table Tennis Championships medalists

References

Chinese male table tennis players
1947 births
2000 deaths
Sportspeople from Tangshan
Table tennis players from Hebei
Accidental deaths in China
World Table Tennis Championships medalists